ETV Network is a network of Telugu language news and entertainment satellite television channels in India. It is based in Hyderabad. It also had some non Telugu language satellite television channels. All non-Telugu language satellite television channels were acquired by Reliance Industries-owned TV18 for ₹2,053 crore in FY 2014–15 and later rebranded.

History

Telugu language network
The Hyderabad daily newspaper Eenadu (Telugu for 'today') started its own Telugu language channel named Eenadu TV on 27 August 1995. 

The flagship company ETPL launched four new television channels in November 2015 - namely ETV Life - a health and wellness channel, ETV Abhiruchi, a cookery channel, ETV Plus - an entertainment and reality channel, and ETV Cinema - a movie channel in Telugu language. In May 2014, ETV2 and ETV3 were renamed to ETV Andhra Pradesh and ETV Telangana respectively.

On 27 December 2018, the network launched ETV Plus HD, ETV Life HD, ETV Abhiruchi HD, and ETV Cinema HD.

Non-Telugu language TV assets
The network also added regional channels in other Indian languages and built a large local news network using ETV brand after success in the Telugu-speaking region. Ramoji Group sold its non Telugu language TV assets to TV18 in January 2014 with a permission to use ETV brand name.

In March 2015, TV18's Viacom 18 decided to rebrand all five non-Telugu language ETV regional general entertainment channels. ETV Marathi, ETV Gujarati, ETV Kannada, ETV Bangla and ETV Odia were rebranded into Colors Marathi, Colors Gujarati, Colors Kannada, Colors Bangla and Colors Odia, respectively.

In March 2018, non-Telugu language TV assets of TV18 still using the ETV brand were rebranded as part of the News18 network.

In April 2016, ETV network added three more regional news channels catering to the audience of Kerala, Tamil Nadu, Assam and North East under the brand name of News18. The channels are named News18 Kerala, News18 Tamil Nadu and News18 Assam-NE.

TV channel

On air channels

Former channels

Telugu language channels

Non-Telugu language channels

References

External links

 
Television networks in India
1995 establishments in India
Telugu-language television
Mass media in Hyderabad, India
Television broadcasting companies of India
Mass media companies of India
Broadcasting